Giorgio Manzoli (died 3 March 1591) (Latin: Georgius Manzolus) was a Roman Catholic prelate who served as Bishop of Aversa (1582–1591).

Biography
On 16 May 1582, Giorgio Manzoli  was appointed by Pope Gregory XIII as Bishop of Aversa. He served as Bishop of Aversa until his death on 3 Mar 1591.

References

External links and additional sources
 (for Chronology of Bishops) 
 (for Chronology of Bishops)  

16th-century Italian Roman Catholic bishops
1591 deaths
Bishops appointed by Pope Gregory XIII
Bishops of Aversa